Răzvan Penescu was a Romanian fencer. He competed in the individual and team épée events at the 1928 Summer Olympics.

References

External links
  

Year of birth missing
Possibly living people
Romanian male fencers
Romanian épée fencers
Olympic fencers of Romania
Fencers at the 1928 Summer Olympics